Myristica conspersa is a species of plant in the family Myristicaceae. It is endemic to West Papua (Indonesia).

References

conspersa
Flora of Western New Guinea
Data deficient plants
Taxonomy articles created by Polbot